Harald Sandberg (October 22, 1883 – November 28, 1940) was a Swedish sailor who competed in the 1912 Summer Olympics. He was part of the Swedish boat Kerstin, which won the bronze medal in the 6 metre class.

References

External links
profile

1883 births
1940 deaths
Swedish male sailors (sport)
Sailors at the 1912 Summer Olympics – 6 Metre
Olympic sailors of Sweden
Olympic bronze medalists for Sweden
Olympic medalists in sailing
Medalists at the 1912 Summer Olympics